Jorge Aguirre (born 18 June 1987) is a Colombian footballer who plays as a forward for Categoría Primera A club Envigado.

Honours

Club
Envigado
Primera B (1): 2007

Leones
Primera B (1): 2008

Rionegro Águilas
Primera B (1): 2010

Junior
Copa Colombia (2): 2015, 2017

References

External links
 

1987 births
Living people
Colombian footballers
Association football forwards
Envigado F.C. players
Leones F.C. footballers
Águilas Doradas Rionegro players
Independiente Santa Fe footballers
Atlético Junior footballers
Atlético Huila footballers
Atlético Bucaramanga footballers
Categoría Primera A players
Sportspeople from Medellín